Lost in Space is the debut album by the Jonzun Crew. It was released by Tommy Boy Records, and was the labels first full-length release. It was recorded in Boston at Boston International Recorders with some additional recording done at Unique Recording in New York.

On its release, some music critics complimented the music's groove and danceability while others found it lacking the power of the group's original singles.

Production
Maurice Johnson and his brother Michael Jonzun began working in their studio trying to create music often attempting to create music such as their track "Pac Man" which received local radio play. After releasing "Pac Man" on his own label Boston International Records, he was contacted by Tommy Boy Records as Jonzun's label did not really have international distribution. "Pac Man" was later was re-done as "Pak Jam".

The album was recorded at Unique Recording in New York and Boston International Recorders in Boston.
Some tracks had added material in New York, such as the laughter and other small elements on "We Are the Jonzun Crew" were added in New York which Michael Jonzun described as being "upgraded and mixed" in New York. The song "Pack Jam" was remixed by John "Jellybean" Benitez.

Music
The music on Lost in Space has been described as an electro-funk. The music on the album is dance-oriented with synthesized vocals. Jonzun did not feel they were a rap group, feeling they were labeled as a rap group due to the name "Crew" in their name, which he stated he called them that as a "flight crew" sounding kind of name.

Release
Lost in Space was released in 1983 on Tommy Boy Records. The album was the first full-length album by Tommy Boy, which previously had only released singles. Lost In Space peaked on the The Billboard 200 at number	66.

A music video was made for their song "Space Cowboy" was shot along New York's West Side Highway and the Hudson River by English director Michael Hoppen.

Tom Silverman of Tommy Boy stated that "We're continually changing [...] We could keep making "Planet Rock" [...] But we're really not interested in that. We want to accelerate the evolution of popular music." In a 1984 interview, the Vice President of Tommy Boy, Monica Lynch stated that was no way Tommy Boy can Just "put out rap and electro-funk records alone", leading to Michael Jonzun's next album having more of an orientation towards love songs and ballads than the electro-based debut.

To celebrate 20 years in the business, Tommy Boy Records re-released Lost in Space on January 16, 2001. The 2001 release added a remix of "Pack Jam (Look Out for the OVC)" by Grooverider.

Reception

From contemporary reviews, Fred Seegmuller referred to the album as "six lengthy dance-oriented tracks" noting "We Are the Jonzun Crew", "Space is the Place", "Space Cowboy" and "Pack Jam" as highlights. J. D. Considine wrote in The Baltimore Sun found that "for all their ability to get the most mileage from a handful of musical tricks, the Jonzun Crew "still manages to wear thin after a while." and that "there's no sense of discovery here beyond the idea that made "Pack Jam" a smash." Robert Christgau wrote in the Village Voice praised "Space Cowboy" but stated that the record as a whole was too silly.

Ken Tucker of The Philadelphia Inquirer praised the album, stating that "Pack Jam" is the most arresting cut on the group's album and found that the album "demonstrates decisively that synthesizer music doesn't have to be chilly, distancing stuff. Jonzun's music ripples with humor and ingratiating energy." Roger Catlin of Omaha World-Herald found that the album was "just short of a having a full record's worth of ideas. With this kind of beat, though, few will notice."

From retrospective reviews, John Bush of AllMusic says that despite the album including the group's best tracks, it was not a successful studio album, stating that group were "lousy songwriters" who "insisted on writing songs" finding the non-singles as "stiff" and "formulaic".

Track listing
Tracklisting and credits are adapted from the back cover of Lost in Space.

Side A
 "We Are The Jonzun Crew" (Michael Jonzun, Maurice Starr) - 6:23
 "Space is the Place" (Jonzun) - 6:27 
 "Electro Boogie Encounter" (Jonzun) - 6:49

Side B
 "Ground Control" (Jonzun, Starr) - 5:40
 "Space Cowboy" (Jonzun) - 5:36
 "Pack Jam (Remix)" (Jonzun, Starr) - 5:09

Credits
Credits are adapted from the sleeve and vinyl sticker of Lost in Space.
 Thomas Silverman - executive producer, co-producer
 Michael Jonzun - producer, engineer, lead vocals, computer programming, electro drums, space bass, space vocals, sound effects, synthesized keyboards, background vocals, string and brass synthesizers
 Maurice Starr - co-producer, pre-production engineer
 Steve "Stevo" Thorpe - electro drumming, syncussion, background vocals
 Frank Heller - engineer
 Oscar Gerardo - pre-production engineer
 Soni Jonzun - pre-production engineer, string synthesizers, sound effects, background vocals
 Sidney Burton - pre-production engineer
 Fred Torchio - pre-production engineer
 Jimmy Mace - pre-production engineer
 Jose "Animal" Diaz - mixing on "We Are the Jonzun Crew"
 John "Jellybean" Benitez - mixing on "Space is the Place" and "Pack Jam"
 Rapahel DeJesus - Latin percussion (on "We Are the Jonzun Crew", "Electro Boogie Encounter")
 Ken Goldbeck - additional arrangements on "Space Cowboy"
 Gordon Worthy - additional arrangements on "Space Cowboy", brass synthesizers, space-bass, electro drums, background vocals
 Geoffrey Chandler - cover art
 Herb Powers, Jr. - mastering

References

Footnotes

Sources
 
 
 
 
 
 
 
 
 
 
 

1983 debut albums
Tommy Boy Records albums
Jonzun Crew albums